Wadi Hawar is a department in the Ennedi-Est region of the Republic of Chad.

History
In an earlier incarnation, Wadi Hawar was a department of the former Ennedi Region in Chad. It was created by Order No. 002 / PR / 08 of 19 February 2008. Its chief town was Amdjarass. It was dissolved in 2012 and replaced by the Ennedi-Est region.

Subdivisions 
The department is divided into 6 sub-prefectures:

 Amdjarass
 Bourdani
 Bao
 Bahai
 Kaoura (or Koura)
 Thunders Djouna

Administration 
List of administrators :

 Prefect of Wadi Hawar (since 2008)

 October 9, 2008: Ali Nour Guedemi
 Sougour Mahamat Galama
 November 3, 2009 : Issaka Hassan Jogoi.

References 

Departments of Chad